Archilobesia is a genus of moths belonging to the subfamily Olethreutinae of the family Tortricidae.

Species
Archilobesia chresta Diakonoff, 1973
Archilobesia crossoleuca (Meyrick, 1933)
Archilobesia doboszi Razowski, 2013
Archilobesia drymoptila (Lower, 1920)
Archilobesia formosana Diakonoff, 1973

See also
List of Tortricidae genera

References

External links
Tortricid.net

Olethreutini
Tortricidae genera
Taxa named by Alexey Diakonoff